Adam Lamhamedi (born 22 April 1995 in Quebec City, Quebec) is a Moroccan-Canadian alpine skier who has competed since 2010 on the Fis circuit. Lamhamedi was born in Canada, and competed for Morocco at the 2014 Winter Olympics in Sochi, Russia.

Early life
Adam Lamhamedi was born on 22 April 1995 in Quebec City to a Moroccan father and a Canadian mother. He began skiing in childhood, winning his first competition at the age of eight. In 2011, he made the decision to compete on behalf of his father's country rather than Canada, both internationally and locally on the provincial ski circuit in Quebec.

Skiing career
Lamhamedi's decision to represent Morocco instead of Canada meant that rather than needing good results in the provincial competitions to qualify internationally, he instead competes directly on behalf of the African nation since 2010. This included his selection for the inaugural Winter Youth Olympics in Innsbruck, Austria, where he was the gold medallist in the first ever boy's super-G competition. This made Lamhamedi the first person representing an African nation to win a medal at Winter Olympic Games of any type. During the course of that year, he was ranked first in Canada for giant slalom and second in slalom.

In the following ski season, he secured enough points to qualify for the 2014 Winter Olympics in Sochi, Russia. He was selected as one of the two person delegation, with his brother Sami also attending the Games as a substitute. He finished in 47th position in the men's giant slalom, but did not finish in the slalom.

References

1995 births
Alpine skiers at the 2014 Winter Olympics
Alpine skiers at the 2018 Winter Olympics
Canadian people of Moroccan descent
Living people
Olympic alpine skiers of Morocco
Moroccan male alpine skiers
Skiers from Quebec City
Alpine skiers at the 2012 Winter Youth Olympics
Laval Rouge et Or athletes
Youth Olympic gold medalists for Morocco
21st-century Moroccan people
21st-century Canadian people